A Mii is a customizable avatar used on several Nintendo video game consoles and mobile apps. The name Mii is a portmanteau of “Wii” and “me”, referring to them typically being avatars of the players. Miis were first introduced on the Wii console in 2006 and later appeared on the 3DS, Wii U, the Switch, and various apps for smart devices. Miis can be created using different body, facial and clothing features, and can then be used as characters within games on the consoles, either as an avatar of a specific player (such as in the Wii series) or in some games (such as Tomodachi Life and Miitopia) portrayed as characters with their own personalities. Miis can be shared and transferred between consoles, either manually or automatically with other users over the internet and local wireless communications.

On the 3DS and Wii U, user accounts are associated with a Mii as their avatar and used as the basis of the systems' social networking features, most prominently the now-defunct Miiverse. On the Nintendo Switch, a Mii can still be used as an account avatar, but avatars depicting various Nintendo characters are also available. Miis are also used as profile pictures for Nintendo Accounts and can be used in Nintendo smart device games such as Super Mario Run, Mario Kart Tour and the now-defunct Miitomo.

Games such as Wii Sports, Wii Sports Resort, Mario Kart Wii, Mario Kart 8, Go Vacation, Super Mario Maker 2, Super Smash Bros. Ultimate and New Super Mario Bros. U Deluxe use Miis as playable characters.

History 
Nintendo's first public debut of free-form personal avatar software was at the Game Developers Conference in 1997, during the Nintendo 64 era. There, Shigeru Miyamoto said that the personal avatar concept had originally been intended as a Famicom demo, where a user could draw a face onto an avatar. Miyamoto commented that the concept could not be turned into a game and the concept was suspended.

In 1999, the 64DD (a disk drive peripheral for the N64) was launched in Japan. Nintendo had produced a short film using the 64DD's Mario Artist: Talent Studios avatar maker, which includes clothes and a built-in movie editor. The player can optionally utilize the Game Boy Camera and the 64DD's Capture Cassette to put their own face upon the avatar.

The next avatar implementation was for the Nintendo e-Reader and GameCube. Along with the Game Boy Camera, it can build an avatar maker. Miyamoto showed another short film they made with this software, which was shown at E3 2002 with the name Stage Debut. This software, renamed to Manebito, was discontinued prior to release.

Nintendo designer Yamashita Takayuki attributes his work on Talent Studio as having been foundational to his eventual work on the Mii, which was necessitated by the development of the game Wii Sports.

Mii creation

Mii characters are created and stored in the Mii Channel or the Mii Maker, which are pre-installed on the Wii and the Nintendo 3DS/Wii U/Nintendo Switch consoles respectively. While the user can assign a gender, name, birthday, favorite color, and mingle preference to a Mii, the majority of the interface used for Mii creation focuses on the appearance of its face and head: the user is given a variety of different hairstyles, eye, nose, and mouth shapes, and other features such as facial hair or wrinkles, to select from. Most of the facial features can be further adjusted, including their size, position, color, and alignment. Accessories such as hats and glasses are also available to add, and the Mii's height and build can also be adjusted. The Mii Maker installed on the Nintendo 3DS and Wii U can use facial recognition to generate a Mii, which selects facial features based on a photograph of a person's face taken with the system's and GamePad's cameras respectively. The features can then be fine-tuned by the user. These versions also have more options than their Wii counterpart. Because the selection of facial features is considered by some to be limited, users are encouraged to develop caricatures of real persons instead of accurate depictions.

Special Miis 
Nintendo periodically released special Miis, usually during E3 or to commemorate game and franchise anniversaries. For a limited time between March 13 and 30, 2007, Wii owners in Japan were sent Mii versions of comedian Sanma Akashiya and tennis player Shuzo Matsuoka. The duo had been featured in Japanese promotions for the Wii, highlighting Miis themselves. Miis of Satoru Iwata and Reggie Fils-Aime (the presidents of Nintendo and Nintendo of America, respectively) were released on the 3DS for the 1st anniversary of the handheld console. During 2013, Nintendo released special Miis of Shigeru Miyamoto and Kensuke Tanabe, and during E3 2013, also released special Miis for Takashi Tezuka, Koichi Hayashida, Eiji Aonuma, and Hideki Konno. Their Miis feature gold pants, as opposed to a gray pair, and cannot be edited or copied. If owners transfer them to another Wii or Wii Remote, they will be removed from their original location, instead of traditionally making another copy.

In late 2011, Nintendo released Swapnote/Nintendo Letter Box for the Nintendo 3DS, which features an original female Mii character called Nikki (ニッキー). Nikki gained a relatively small fan base of her own right, especially in Japan.

Editing limitations 
It is possible to create special Mii-like characters through the use of third-party software, but Nintendo typically will force these entrepreneurs to shut down. Sometimes when a customer has needed to return their Wii for service, a replacement machine must be sent. When that happens, the Mii software recognizes it is a different system and will not allow any editing of Miis created on the original system. Nintendo, while offering to copy game data and Miis to the new machine, will not alter the Miis so that they can be edited on the replacement machine.

Wii

Mii Channel 

The Mii Channel is the app that allows Mii creation on the Wii menu. It can store up to 100+ Miis similarly than the Nintendo 3DS and Nintendo Switch and Wii Remotes are also able to store and transfer up to ten Miis to other consoles. It is also possible to see other Miis from TV shows and games.

Uses in games 

Miis are intended to be an extension of the player, and in keeping with this spirit, the user can use them in several Nintendo titles for the Wii. Wii Sports is perhaps the best-known example of this, and it adds a further personal touch to Miis by saving game statistics and records for individual Miis. Miis will make cameo appearances as computer-controlled opponents, teammates, or within the audience. Miis have been used to serve as game file icons (profiles) within several games. Often appearing as just a head for identification, this Mii has no impact on the actual gameplay other than to identify a player in another way besides the name, or representation based on looks.

Miis are primarily used in games such as Wii Sports, Wii Play, Wii Fit, Wii Party, Wii Fit Plus, Wii Music and Wii Sports Resort. Players can also use their Miis, however, in other first-party games, most noticeably within WarioWare: Smooth Moves, Mario & Sonic at the Olympic Games, Mario Party 8, Mario Kart Wii, Mario Super Sluggers, Animal Crossing: City Folk (using their Mii's head as a mask) and in Go Vacation. The Japan-only Sega game Pachinko: Sammy's Collection is the first third-party game to incorporate Miis, while the Wii version of FIFA Soccer 08 is the first third-party game released in North America, Europe and Australia to use the Mii Channel. Many other games, like We Ski, and Guitar Hero World Tour and Sonic Colors also use Miis.

While a Mii's head always remains the same, its body varies between games. For example, in Wii Sports, the Mii's body is stylized, with spherical floating hands and bearing no arms, and Mii audiences or CPUs floating with spherical bottoms with no legs instead, but in Wii Fit its body is designed to look more natural, and its weight will be determined by the weight Wii Fit found of the player in Wii Fit tests. Sometimes Miis will wear outfits in context with the game. In Super Mario Galaxy and its sequel, the Miis can be optionally used for the planet's icon that represents the save file, the other option being to use Mario characters for the planets. Only the Mii's head is shown and it's shown in a sphere shaped like the planet. In Mario Kart Wii, Mii racers can be dressed in jumpsuits, or Mario style overalls for males and a Peach style dress for females, in Dr. Mario Online Rx, Miis appear in medical clothing, and in Metroid Prime 3: Corruption, where they appear as bobblehead dolls, they will be dressed up in bounty hunter Samus Aran's Power Suit. In MLB Power Pros, Miis are designed to look like regular Power Pro-Kun avatar, with legs detached from the main body. In Dance Dance Revolution Hottest Party 2, the Mii's body is formed more like a regular human. This design was, however, criticized by IGN's Lucas M. Thomas, who sarcastically commented that "[it] doesn't look disturbing at all."

While Miis are not playable in Super Smash Bros. Brawl, the creator of the series, Masahiro Sakurai, explained that Miis were originally considered to be playable in the game, but the idea was decided against due to fears of bullying. They would eventually debut in Super Smash Bros. for Nintendo 3DS and Wii U.

Everybody Votes Channel 

Miis were incorporated in the downloadable Everybody Votes Channel, where Miis represented the voter. Up to six different Miis could be registered within the channel to use in voting. The channel was discontinued along with the Check Mii Out channel by Nintendo on June 28, 2013, as they moved on to other next-generation projects.

Check Mii Out Channel 

Perhaps an evolution of an idea shared by Shigeru Miyamoto at the Game Developers Conference in 2007, this channel allowed players to upload their Mii characters and share them with other users. There were also popularity contests, in which players would design a Mii that would personify a specific idea or character and then vote on the Mii that would best fit the suggestion. The channel was available for free download on the Wii Shop Channel from November 12, 2007, until June 27, 2013, when Nintendo discontinued the channel along with the Everybody Votes channel.

Nintendo DS 
Although the platform lacks native support for Mii creation, a few games on the Nintendo DS console do support Mii functionality, and will work in conjunction with the Wii's Mii Channel.

Uses in games 

Miis can be transferred from a user's Wii to supported Nintendo DS games via the Mii Channel. A code must be entered by the user to unlock the feature on the Mii Channel.

The Nintendo DS game Personal Trainer: Walking uses Miis to allow players to track their progress in the game. Players are also able to create Miis in-game. The Nintendo DS version of Final Fantasy Crystal Chronicles: Echoes of Time also uses Miis.

The life-simulation game Tomodachi Collection, only released in Japan for the Nintendo DS, also uses Miis and has a built-in Mii editor. Miis from the user's Wii's Mii Channel can be transferred to the game, and vice versa.

Nintendo 3DS

Mii Maker 
The  is the app that allows Mii creation on the Nintendo 3DS. It can store up to 100 Mii characters, much like the Wii and later Nintendo Switch, and includes more facial features than the latter console. The Mii Maker installed on the Nintendo 3DS can use facial recognition to generate a Mii, which selects facial features based on a photograph of a person's face taken with the system's cameras.

Uses in games 

Unlike the Nintendo DS, which features limited support of Mii characters, its successor the Nintendo 3DS features Miis as a standard. Similar to the Wii's Mii Channel, the Nintendo 3DS features its own Mii-creating application called Mii Maker, which is more advanced than the Mii Channel.

Mii characters can be created manually with Mii Maker as on the Wii's Mii Channel, but they can also be created automatically through the use of the Nintendo 3DS's cameras. The system captures an image of a subject's face, and the application converts the image into a Mii likeness using integrated recognition software. Automated Mii character designs can be manually adjusted. Mii characters can also be imported from the Wii to the 3DS or from the 3DS to the Wii U. However, Miis cannot be sent from the 3DS to the Wii, as Mii Maker features an expanded selection of design parts that are not available on Mii Channel.

The Nintendo 3DS can generate and read QR codes that represent Mii characters. QR codes and pictures of Mii characters can also be transferred to an SD card in any picture format, and be used in various ways, such as posting them on a web page. Miis on the Nintendo 3DS can also be used in conjunction with the device's Augmented Reality software - the software includes a mini-app named 'Mii Pics' which allows the user to take a photo of their Mii within a regular photo, using an augmented reality card included with the system.

The first Nintendo 3DS game to include support for Mii characters is Pilotwings Resort. Miis obtained through StreetPass appear as non-player characters in Nintendogs + Cats. Mii characters also appear in Pokémon Rumble Blast, Mario Kart 7, and in many more games.

Currently, the most notable game to feature Miis in their entirety is Tomodachi Life, the sequel to Tomodachi Collection, which was only released in Japan for the Nintendo DS. This is also the first game to give Miis complete lines of dialogue as well as the first game to allow players to choose what Miis say. Miitopia is another Mii-centric game title for the Nintendo 3DS, also released on the Nintendo Switch in May 2021.

StreetPass Mii Plaza

A feature on the Nintendo 3DS, the  makes use of the handheld's StreetPass feature, which data can be transferred between nearby Nintendo 3DS consoles in standby mode. As Miis are gathered in the plaza, they can be used in numerous minigames, with the initial two being Puzzle Swap and Find Mii (known as StreetPass Quest in PAL regions). In Puzzle Swap, players can exchange pieces of several jigsaw puzzle panels based on Nintendo games, in which there were initially seven, but this number increased with occasional updates. Find Mii is an RPG minigame in which players use the Miis they gathered to fight through dungeons, earning accessories for their Mii. Each Mii possesses a different type of magic depending on their color, and become more powerful if the player meets them more than once. These games can be optionally played with Play Coins, though the results are more random than with Streetpass Miis. On December 6, 2011, the feature was updated to include SpotPass functionality, as well as new puzzle panels, a sequel to Find Mii, a map showing where players met other Miis, Accomplishments and a music player.

Special Miis released by Nintendo and obtained through SpotPass can also be used in StreetPass Mii Plaza. They have access to all Puzzle Swap pieces and provide a level 5 player for Find Mii.

Wii U

Mii Maker 
[[Image:Mii Maker screenshot.jpg|200px|thumb|Screenshot of the Mii Maker'''s creation tool on Wii U]]
The  is the app that allows Mii creation on the Wii U. It can store up to 3,000 Miis and includes the same facial features used on the Nintendo 3DS. The Mii Maker installed on the Wii U can use facial recognition to generate a Mii, which selects the features based on a photo of a face taken with the Wii U GamePad camera.

 Uses in games 

Mii characters evolve further for the Wii's successor, Wii U. In addition to previous uses on the Wii, Mii characters are wholly integrated into the Wii U's social online network Miiverse, the WaraWara Plaza community where clusters of Mii characters crowd around the hottest games, and being depicted as personal avatars for individual Wii U players, who have the ability for twelve separate Nintendo Network ID User accounts that can be used on a single console at a time. User accounts with Mii representatives are used for both games and apps such as Nintendo TVii. Mii characters can be transferred from the Wii and/or the Nintendo 3DS to the Wii U, in which in the latter's case transfers between consoles can occur as many times as possible. Mii characters also return as in-game characters for certain Wii U games, which in addition to Nintendo-published launch titles such as Super Smash Bros. for Wii U, Mario Kart 8, New Super Mario Bros. U and Nintendo Land, they are also included in third-party titles such as Sonic & All-Stars Racing Transformed. In Mario Kart 8, there are 19+ amiibo suits when you tap an amiibo on the left side of the Wii U Gamepad based on the customizable characters.The Legend of Zelda: Breath of the Wild uses an evolved form of Mii, UMii, to render non-essential NPCs.

 Nintendo Switch 

 Miis can be used on the Nintendo Switch to represent accounts; unlike previous Nintendo consoles, users may optionally use a Nintendo character such as Mario as their avatar instead, but Miis can still be integrated into games as a playable character such as Mario Kart 8 Deluxe, Go Vacation, Nintendo Switch Sports, Super Smash Bros. Ultimate and New Super Mario Bros. U Deluxe. The Mii Maker is located within the console's system settings menu and, unlike previous Mii Makers, provides unnatural hair and eye colors. Miis can be transferred between Nintendo Switch consoles and imported from a Nintendo 3DS or Wii U using an amiibo figure. Miis can also be imported from a Nintendo Account. In Mario Kart 8 Deluxe, there are 20 amiibos registered after when you tap an amiibo on the NFC reader here on the Joy-Con (R), or on the top of the Nintendo Switch Pro Controller. Like with the Wii and Nintendo 3DS, the Nintendo Switch can hold up to 100+ Miis.

The first and the only Mii-centered game released on the Nintendo Switch so far is Miitopia, a remaster of the 2017 role-playing video game originally on the Nintendo 3DS.

The Miis are also featured in Nintendo Switch Sports. However, new avatars called "Sportsmates" are also playable.

 Other platforms 

When the freemium mobile app (since shut down) Miitomo launched on iOS and Android devices, it was possible for the first time to officially create Mii characters without the need for a Nintendo console. Mii characters created on the app initially resembled their Wii U counterparts, with a later update introducing Nintendo Switch standards, and use the same attributes. Nintendo Account holders can opt to use the app to create Mii avatars without the need to link their accounts to any Nintendo console, with the option also available. Miitomo was also be used to support Mii avatars on other Nintendo apps for smart devices. For example, an update released for Super Mario Run on April 25, 2017, introduced player Mii icon customization options with the support of Miitomo, and its in-game costumes, via the same Nintendo Account. Miitomo was only available in 60 of the 165 countries/territories recognized by Nintendo Accounts by May 9, 2018, when it was discontinued.

On May 24, 2018, Nintendo introduced a browser-based Mii editor called Mii Studio. The editor is integrated into all Nintendo Accounts for users in all regions, including regions that did not originally have official support for Miitomo. Mii Studio supports all Mii attributes and standards introduced for the Nintendo Switch. Up to six Mii avatars can be created at a time, including any Mii imported from a linked Nintendo Network ID (also known as NNID).

In a pre-queue area for Mario Kart: Koopa's Challenge'' at the Super Nintendo World amusement area in Universal Studios Japan, Mii characters appear on several screens to showcase ride mechanics and safety precautions.

See also
Xbox Avatars
PlayStation Home, which also featured avatar creation

References

External links 
 Mii Channel at Nintendo.com

Computer-related introductions in 2006
Video game characters introduced in 2006
Nintendo protagonists
Video game characters of selectable gender
Video game mascots
Virtual avatars
Wii
Super Smash Bros. fighters
Fictional racing drivers
Fictional martial artists